Jack Kyle Farris (born May 6, 1934) is a retired major general in the United States Air Force.

Biography
Farris was born in Fennimore, Wisconsin, in 1934. He attended the University of Southern California and Dartmouth College.

Farris married his wife, Nina, in 1958. They had two children together, a son, Kyle Farris, and a daughter, Karen Farris Luce. Jack and Nina Farris have four grandchildren and currently reside in Florida.

Career
Farris graduated from the United States Military Academy in 1957. Later he graduated from the Squadron Officer School, the Industrial College of the Armed Forces, and the Air War College. In 1964 he was assigned to the United States Air Force Academy as an air officer commanding. During the Vietnam War he served with the 12th Air Commando Squadron. Later he was named Deputy Commandant of the Cadet Wing and of Military Instruction at the Air Force Academy. From 1979 to 1981 he held command of the 2nd Bombardment Wing. In 1984 he was named Deputy Chief of Staff for Strategic Planning and Analysis of the Strategic Air Command. Later he became vice commander of the 15th Air Force. His retirement was effective as of September 1, 1989.

Awards he has received include the Defense Superior Service Medal, the Legion of Merit with oak leaf cluster, the Distinguished Flying Cross, the Purple Heart, the Meritorious Service Medal with oak leaf cluster, the Air Medal with silver oak leaf cluster and four bronze oak leaf clusters, the Air Force Commendation Medal with oak leaf cluster, the Combat Readiness Medal, the Parachutist Badge, and the Missile Badge.

References

1934 births
Living people
Air War College alumni
People from Fennimore, Wisconsin
Military personnel from Wisconsin
United States Air Force generals
Recipients of the Legion of Merit
Recipients of the Distinguished Flying Cross (United States)
Recipients of the Air Medal
United States Air Force personnel of the Vietnam War
United States Military Academy alumni
University of Southern California alumni
Dartmouth College alumni
Dwight D. Eisenhower School for National Security and Resource Strategy alumni 
Recipients of the Defense Superior Service Medal